Hyacinthoides cedretorum is a species of bluebell that grows in North Africa.

Description
Hyacinthoides cedretorum differs from other species of Hyacinthoides in the strongly revolute (curved backwards) form of the tepals, with the stamens being attached to the tepals only at their bases; in other species, the stamens are fused to the tepals along much of their length, and the tepals form a bell-like shape. The anthers and pollen are typically violet-blue, but populations from the High Atlas mountains have creamy-yellow pollen.

Distribution and ecology
Hyacinthoides cedretorum is found in mountainous areas of Morocco and Algeria, from the Rif Mountains to the mountains of Jijel Province, including the High Atlas and Anti-Atlas mountains. In the High Atlas, it grows on exposed cliff ledges.

Taxonomy and karyology
The first description of H. cedretorum as a separate taxon was made by Auguste Pomel in 1874, when he described "Endymion cedretorum" in his work , based on plants growing on Djebel Endate in Algeria. The same species was later described by Jules Aimé Battandier as "Endymion patulus subsp. algeriensis", and by Alfred Charles Chabert as "Endymion kabylicus". Both Pomel's name and Battandier's name have been treated as infraspecific taxa (subspecies or variety) within the species Hyacinthoides hispanica, but it is now regarded as a separate species, and was placed in the genus Hyacinthoides in 2009.

Hyacinthoides cedretorum is the only tetraploid species in the genus; it is unclear whether it originated by autopolyploidy or allopolyploidy.

References

External links

cedretorum
Flora of Morocco
Flora of Algeria
Plants described in 1874